Glyptoscelimorpha juniperae is a species of false jewel beetle in the family Schizopodidae. It is found in North America.

Subspecies
These two subspecies belong to the species Glyptoscelimorpha juniperae:
 Glyptoscelimorpha juniperae juniperae (Knull, 1940)
 Glyptoscelimorpha juniperae viridiceps Nelson in Nelson & Bellamy, 1991

References

Further reading

 
 
 

Schizopodidae
Articles created by Qbugbot
Beetles described in 1940